Garrell Vernell Hartman (May 20, 1913 – July 15, 1979) was an American Negro league outfielder in the 1940s.

A native of Lexington, North Carolina, Hartman played for the Philadelphia Stars in 1944. In his 19 recorded games, he posted eight hits in 32 plate appearances. Hartman died in Winston-Salem, North Carolina in 1979 at age 66.

References

External links
 and Seamheads

1913 births
1979 deaths
Philadelphia Stars players
Baseball outfielders
Baseball players from North Carolina
People from Lexington, North Carolina
20th-century African-American sportspeople